A conflagration is a large fire. Conflagrations often damage human life, animal life, health, and/or property. A conflagration can begin accidentally or be intentionally created (arson). A very large fire can produce a firestorm, in which the central column of rising heated air induces strong inward winds, which supply oxygen to the fire.  Conflagrations can cause casualties including deaths or injuries from burns, trauma due to collapse of structures and attempts to escape, and smoke inhalation.

Firefighting is the practice of extinguishing a conflagration, protecting life and property and minimizing damage and injury.  One of the goals of fire prevention is to avoid conflagrations.  When a conflagration is extinguished, there is often a fire investigation to determine the cause of the fire.

Causes and types

During a conflagration a significant movement of air and combustion products occurs. Hot gaseous products of combustion move upward, causing the influx of more dense cold air to the combustion zone. Sometimes, the influx is so intense that the fire grows into a firestorm.

Inside a building, the intensity of gas exchange depends on the size and location of openings in walls and floors, the ceiling height, and the amount and characteristics of the combustible materials.

Types

Industrial conflagrations include fires at oil refineries, such as the 2009 Cataño oil refinery fire.
Wildfires are fires in forests or other undeveloped areas, and may grow into a conflagration.
An urban conflagration is defined as a "large, destructive fire that spreads beyond natural or artificial barriers; it can be expected to result in large monetary loss and may or may not include fatalities. An urban conflagration moves beyond a block and destroys whole sections of a city." Notable examples includes the Great Fire of Tartu in 1775, the Great Fire of Turku in 1827, and the Great Fire of Hamburg in 1842. The Camp Fire in Paradise, California in 2018 burned 18,000 structures and killed 85 people.
In some ships, a large uncontained fire may quickly lead to a ship conflagration. 
The conflagration of a building is known as a structure fire.

Notable examples

See also
 Deflagration
 Fire department

References

External links
Conflagration on map (AccidentMap.com Accident on map)

Combustion
Fire
Firefighting
Types of fire